This is a list of Lithuanian singers in alphabetical order.

4
 4Fun

A
 Nijolė Ambrazaitytė (1939-2016)
 Atlanta (1981)

B
 Vytautas Babravičius (1952)
 Vaidas Baumila (1987)

C
 Alanas Chošnau (1974)

D
 Danielius Dolskis (1891-1931)

F
 Viktorija Faith (1986)
 Fusedmarc

G
 Vaida Genytė (1974)
 GiedRé (1985)
 GJan (1995)
 Asmik Grigorian (1981)
 Justina Gringytė (1986)

I
 InCulto

J
 Inga Jankauskaitė (1981)
 Mantas Jankavičius (1980)
 Severija Janušauskaitė (1981)
 Jarosekas Quartet
 Gintarė Jautakaitė
 Vytautas Juozapaitis (1963)
 Eglė Jurgaitytė (1998)

K
 Rasa Kaušiūtė (1977)
 Nomeda Kazlaus (1974)
 Vytautas Kernagis (1951-2008)

L
 Laura and the Lovers
 Judita Leitaitė (1959)
 Nechama Lifshitz (1927-2017)
 Linas and Simona
 Monika Linkytė (1992)
 Monika Liu (1988)
 Arnoldas Lukošius (1967)

M
 Andrius Mamontovas (1967)
 Mango
 Vilija Matačiūnaitė (1986)
 Mia (1983)
 Marijonas Mikutavičius (1971)
 Jeronimas Milius (1984)
 Donny Montell (1987)
 Saulius Mykolaitis (1966-2006)
 Vilija Matačiūnaitė (1984)

N
 Ieva Narkutė (1987)
 Virgilijus Noreika (1935-2018)

O
 Alina Orlova (1988)

P
 Kipras Petrauskas (1885-1968)
 Aistė Pilvelytė (1979)
 Andrius Pojavis (1983)
 Stasys Povilaitis (1947-2015)

R
 Radži (1987)
 Violeta Riaubiškytė-Tarasovienė (1974)
 Mindaugas Rojus (1981)
 The Roop
 Audrius Rubežius (1966)

S
 Evelina Sašenko (1987)
 Sati (1976)
 Rūta Ščiogolevaitė (1981)
 Jurga Šeduikytė (1980)
 Neringa Siaudikyte (1990)
 Simonna (1995)
 SKAMP
 Jomantė Šležaitė (1989)
 Aistė Smilgevičiūtė (1977)
 Sasha Son (1983)
 Stano (1981)
 Aivaras Stepukonis (1972)
 Sigutė Stonytė (1955)

U
 Violeta Urmana (1961)

V
 Lena Valaitis (1943)
 Jurijus Veklenko (1990)
 Ovidijus Vyšniauskas (1957)

Z
 Elena Zagorskaya (1943)
 Ieva Zasimauskaitė (1993)

 
Singers
Lithuanian